Daniel Cross a Canadian documentary filmmaker, producer and activist whose films deal with social justice.

Cross is co-founder and president of EyeSteelFilm with fellow director/producer Mila Aung-Thwin. He is also founder of Homeless Nation, a non-profit internet endeavor that started in 2006 and has become a Canadian national collective voice by and for Canada's homeless population. Cross is a professor at the Mel Hoppenheim School of Cinema, Concordia University, Montreal

Education

Cross is a graduate of Concordia University, BFA 91, MFA 98.

Career
Cross directed the films The Street: A Film with the Homeless and S.P.I.T.: Squeegee Punks In Traffic, where hundreds of homeless people from Montreal shared their many, amazing stories with him. From the movie, came the idea of a forum where these stories would not be lost and where Canada's homeless community could share their stories and refuse to be ignored. Both films received theatrical distribution, international broadcast and critical acclaim

Cross also has experience in TV broadcasting, having directed and produced the Gemini nominated Too Colourful for the League and Chairman George on the stations CTV, BBC's Storyville and TV 2 (Denmark).

Chairman George won awards at the AFI/Silverdocs and at Guangzhou Documentary Festival.

He was the executive producer of the internationally acclaimed Up the Yangtze, about a pleasure cruise through the devastation the world's largest hydro-electric dam caused.

In addition to making films, Cross is active in the film community, serving on the boards of CFTPA, Observatoire du Documentaire and DOC (formerly CIFC). He also serves as a board member of Hot Docs Canadian International Documentary Festival and the "Documentary Organization of Canada" and teaches film production at Concordia University in Montreal, Quebec.  Previously, he taught at University of Regina in Regina, Saskatchewan.

Awards and participations
In 2015 he won the Canada Screen Award (Canada's Oscar) for Best Theatrical Documentary Film and Best Cinematography for I Am The Blues 
He received the Doc Institute Luminary Award, The Trailblazer award at MIPDOC in France, The Don Haig Award at Hot Docs and is a member of the Provosts Circle of Distinction at Concordia University
In 2010 he won the United Nations World Summit Award for e-inclusion with his project Homeless Nation
In 2006, he won the Golden Sheaf Award at Yorkton Short Film and Video Festival for Chairman George alongside Mila Aung-Thwin.

Filmography
The Street: A Film with the Homeless (1997)
S.P.I.T. - Squeegee Punks In Traffic (2001)
Too Colourful for the League (2001)
Inuuvunga: I Am Inuk, I Am Alive (2004)
Chairman George (2005)
Atanasoff, Father of the Computer (2014)
I Am the Blues (2015)

References

External links
 
EyeSteelFilm Official web site

EyeSteelFilm
Canadian documentary film directors
Academic staff of Concordia University
Anglophone Quebec people
Canadian film educators
Film producers from Quebec
Living people
Film directors from Montreal
Concordia University alumni
Directors of Genie and Canadian Screen Award winners for Best Documentary Film
Year of birth missing (living people)